Iolonioro is a department or commune of Bougouriba Province in south-western Burkina Faso. Its capital lies at the town of Iiolonioro. According to the 2006 census the department has a population of 20,677.

Towns and villages
IiolonioroBarkouraBarseraBinteBotoroBurkinaoDiassaraDjonlèraDoumbouroDounkoraDounteloGairo, Burkina FasoGbingueGomgombiroGongontianoHebrimponoKambeledagaKourseraKpalbaloLoukouraMilpoNiombounaNiombripoNonkuéroN’tonheroOuidiara
PergdalembiroPokouroPoyoSangoloSarambourSarambouraSidoumoukarSidoumoukar-HiroSinamananaTiarkiroTomenaTorkiaroWerinkeraYeyeraYounora

References

Departments of Burkina Faso
Bougouriba Province